Chad Fischer is an American singer-songwriter, multi-instrumentalist, composer and producer from Santa Monica, California, also known as the frontman of the band Lazlo Bane.

Early years

Chad Fischer's early work was being a drummer for the band School of Fish founded by his college friend Josh Clayton-Felt. Fischer replaced the original drummer M.P. in 1991, however he did not play on the band's second album due to fallout with a producer and was replaced by Josh Freese. Nevertheless, Fischer still stayed with the band to perform live. The only official commercial School of Fish release that included his drumming was the single "Take Me Anywhere", which included two live tracks as b-sides.

After School of Fish disbanded in 1994 Chad Fischer went on to build his own recording studio and started to write new material. He signed to Almo Sounds label and formed the band Lazlo Bane, whose debut album, 11 Transistor was released in January 1997.

During the early years Chad Fischer met Colin Hay with whom he became a close friend. Fisher played drums on Hay's 1994 album Topanga, while Hay contributed guitar and vocals to Lazlo Bane's cover of "Overkill" from their debut album. Since then Chad Fischer took part in recording of every Hay's subsequent studio album up to Next Year People in 2015, with Fischer's role varying from session musician and songwriter to mixing engineer and co-producer.

Fischer was briefly a member of Don Piper's band A Don Piper Situation playing drums, producing and engineering the track "Ray Falls Down" on the self-titled 1997 EP.

Work with Lazlo Bane

After Almo Sounds was bought by Universal Music Group Lazlo Bane continued their career as an independent band. Chad Fischer continued to produce Lazlo Bane albums with them being recorded in his own studio and released through the self-established label both named Lookout Sound.

The band's second album All the Time in the World was released in 2002. It included the song "Superman", which became the Lazlo Bane's most recognizable song as it became a theme song for the popular American TV series Scrubs. Chad Fischer along with Lazlo Bane members Tim Bright and Chris Link as songwriters of "Superman" and Scrubs' composer Jan Stevens won BMI TV Music Award of 2003 and 2004.

Over the next decade Lazlo Bane released two more studio albums and one EP, all of them independently. Another album by the band, Big Spill, was released in 2013 and was credited to The Rage, Lazlo Bane's alter ego project.

Solo career
In October 2019 Chad Fischer released his first non film and TV series related album of music titled National Parks which was dedicated to the American national parks and monuments.

In April 2020 Chad Fischer started releasing videos of music covers on a regular basis. The videos sometimes featured guest appearances by various musicians including long time Fischer's collaborators Larry Goldings, Colin Hay, and School of Fish band members  among others. As of October 2021 Fischer released a total of eight videos. Seven songs from these recordings were included on Lazlo Bane album Someday We'll Be Together, which was released on 30 October 2021.

In early 2022 Chad Fischer participated in The Great Song Podcast and Dig Me Out podcast discussing his early musical career with School of Fish, Lazlo Bane, breakthrough of "Superman" as Scrubs theme song and recent video releases and Lazlo Bane reunion.

In July 2022 Fischer released a new video, the cover of The Jayhawks "Blue".

Films and TV series scoring

Films

In the beginning of 2000s Chad Fischer started providing music and songs for various films and TV shows.

His first full-length film for which he provided the scores was Garden State, released in 2004. Both the film and its soundtrack proved to be critically and commercially acclaimed. Garden State also featured Fischer's original song called "Motorcycle Ride with Sam." It hasn't been officially released, but it is available to listen in the DVD menu of the film and on his Myspace page.

2005's Little Manhattan featured new songs, both by Fischer and Lazlo Bane, that were written especially for the film. It also featured a cover of The Beatles' song "In My Life" produced by Fischer and performed by Matt Scannell. No soundtrack album was ever released, although one of Fischer's songs, "Map of My Heart", is available to listen on his Myspace page. However, promotional compilation of Chad Fischer's music from Garden State and Little Manhattan also featuring his production work was released circa 2005.

For the 2008 film The Rocker Chad Fischer wrote the score and a number of original songs which were performed by fictional bands A.D.D. and Vesuvius. The actual music was mostly performed by Chad Fischer himself with the vocals provided by Teddy Geiger (for A.D.D.) and Keith England (for Vesuvius). A soundtrack album that featured all the original material was also released in 2008.

In the 2009 film Ice Age: Dawn of the Dinosaurs, Chad sings a version of Gilbert O'Sullivan's "Alone Again (Naturally)".

Other films for which Fischer wrote the score are 10 Years, Loosies, The Babysitters, Black Cloud and Chasing Mavericks.

In 2018, Fischer returned to film scores with Eat, Brains, Love directed by Rodman Flender.

Wildflower, a new film with score by Chad Fischer, premiered in 2022.

Aside from film scores Chad Fischer wrote and performed a number of songs for the films he worked on, however none of them were released on any soundtrack albums or elsewhere.

TV series
Chad Fischer's early work on TV scores include shows My Guide to Becoming a Rock Star and The Class.

In 2007 Chad Fischer and Lazlo Bane guitarist Tim Bright started scoring American medical drama series Private Practice. During its run Fischer and Bright won BMI TV Music Award four times: in 2008, 2009, 2010 and 2012. The show concluded after six seasons in 2013.

After Private Practice Chad Fischer started providing music for another ABC's show, Scandal. For his work he won the BMI TV Music Award six times from 2013 to 2018.

In early 2018 the show's score album was released, consisting entirely of Chad Fischer's music. Scandal itself has also ended in 2018.

In 2016 Fischer started scoring yet another ABC's TV series The Catch. The show ended in 2017.

After ABC shows Chad Fischer scored the first season of the YouTube Premium original anthology 2019 series Weird City.

Record producer
Chad Fischer started production work from the first Lazlo Bane album 11 Transistor and produced every subsequent album of the band.

After the death of Fischer's longtime friend and School of Fish bandmate Josh Clayton-Felt, he co-executive produced the release of Center of Six, the second Clayton-Felt's posthumous album. It included several tribute songs produced by Chad Fischer and recorded by Josh's friends.

Fischer's production career progressed as he produced the first recordings and helped develop the sound of Cary Brothers, Alexi Murdoch and Joshua Radin. All of them later became successful musical acts.

The highly acclaimed Garden State soundtrack, released in 2004, subsequently winning a Grammy Award in 2005 and receiving platinum certification, featured two songs produced by Chad Fischer: "Blue Eyes" performed by Cary Brothers and "Winding Road" performed by actress Bonnie Somerville.

Other musicians and bands Fischer did production for feature Everlast, Lisa Loeb, Colin Hay and The Good Luck Joes among others.

Discography

Studio albums

Soundtrack albums

As featured artist

Songs written and performed for films

Music videos

As director

With Lazlo Bane
Studio albums

EPs

With A Don Piper Situation
EPs

As producer, engineer, composer or session musician

External links

 Chad Fischer on Myspace
 Chad Fischer on IMDB

References

 
Living people
American male singer-songwriters
Musicians from Santa Monica, California
Record producers from California
Singer-songwriters from California
American film score composers
American television composers
American male film score composers
Male television composers
Place of birth missing (living people)
Year of birth missing (living people)